Vårt älskade 80-tal is a Wahlströms studio album, released on 2 June 2010, mostly consisting of recordings of 1980s songs. It also included the newly-written song "Anna".

Track listing

Contributors
Wahlströms
Tobias Nyström - Producer

Chart positions

References 

2010 albums
Wahlströms albums